Johann "John" Grander (24 April 1930 – 24 September 2012) was the Austrian inventor of the Hexagonal water technique, which has since scientifically been proven as ineffective.

Life
Grander was born in Jochberg, Austria, the second of five children with a difficult childhood. At the age of 13, he was trained by the Nazis to work in agriculture.

Revitalized water
Grander invented a scientifically not proven process for treating water, producing what he called "revitalized water" (German: belebtes Wasser). According to Grander, this improves the water structure and produces a healthy environment for useful microorganisms.

In 1978, Grander gave up his profession and founded the Grander family business for original Grander technology in 1979. His approach to the study of the anomalous properties of water is similar to Masaru Emoto, Viktor Schauberger, Jacques Benveniste et al. Grander's family continue in activities for the treatment, production and marketing of revitalized water and water treatment equipment.

It is scientific consensus that the claims as to how the process changes water are not supported by physics or chemistry and may be called "esoteric nonsense".

Nevertheless, supporters claim that it cuts the running costs of industry from steel works to fruit canning factories, of public swimming pools, and makes for more effective water-based physiotherapy for injuries. Some companies using Grander water insist that the Grander revitalization process works and saves them money.

Legal rulings

In 2005 Ecoworld NZ Ltd was fined $60,000 and ordered to pay $68,000 in compensation to consumers that bought their Grander Living Water units. The judge said that the promotional material for these units "contained inconsistencies, quackery and pseudo-science."

In 2006, the Viennese Oberlandesgericht ruled that the claim that seriously ill people may forgo medical treatment and trust in the effects of the revitalized water does not constitute fraud because the vendor guarantees a right of return. They also ruled that Grander's revitalized water may adequately be described as "esoteric nonsense".

In 2009, another New Zealand company, Big Blue Limited involved in the "energised" water using "Wasser 2000 Vibration Technology" was fined $25,000 in the Auckland District Court for making false claims.

Awards

In 2001, the Republic of Austria recognized the life work of Johann Grander with the Honorary Cross for Science and Art. A 2008 parliamentary initiative to strip him of the award on the grounds of missing scientific merits was unsuccessful. The reason given was that the only other person stripped of the award was a Nazi doctor and that Grander's case was less severe.

He has also been awarded the Silver Honorary Award by the Russian Academy of Natural Science, a private entity that does not have any association with the Russian Academy of Sciences.

References

1930 births
2012 deaths
Pseudoscience
20th-century Austrian inventors
Water